Charles Dingle (December 28, 1887 – January 19, 1956) was an American stage and film actor.

Early life
Dingle was born December 28, 1887, in Wabash, Indiana. His father was John Crockett Dingle, and he was said to be a descendant of Davy Crockett.

Career

Dingle's dramatic debut came in a production of Forgiven. At age 14 he portrayed a 65-year-old man. When he was 18, he became the Woodward Stock Company's leading man. In 1914 he was the Fosberg Players' leading man.

He began selling real estate in New Jersey in 1927, but he made his Broadway debut in Killers in 1928. After that he again sold real estate, but decreasing sales led him back to acting. Better roles followed including Duke Theseus in the 1932 revival of A Midsummer Night's Dream and Sheriff Cole in Let Freedom Ring in 1935. He made his musical debut in Irving Berlin's Miss Liberty in 1950.

A veteran of over 50 feature films, he was best known for portraying hard edged businessmen and villains, such as Ben Hubbard, the crafty eldest member of the Hubbard family in The Little Foxes on both stage and screen, and Senator Brockway in the film version of Call Me Madam.

Critic Bosley Crowther wrote of his performance in the film version of The Little Foxes in The New York Times that Dingle was a "perfect villain in respectable garb".

His last stage appearance was in 1954's The Immoralist co-starring Louis Jourdan, Geraldine Page and James Dean; it was also Dean's last Broadway appearance.

Personal life and death
He was married to actress Dorothy L. White. He died on January 19, 1956, after a brief illness at age 68 in Worcester Memorial Hospital in Worcester, Massachusetts. He was cremated and his ashes scattered in Germany.

Partial filmography

Du Barry Did All Right (1937, Short) - John Wainwright
...One Third of a Nation... (1939) - Mr. Rogers
The Little Foxes (1941) - Ben Hubbard
Unholy Partners (1941) - Clyde Fenton
Johnny Eager (1941) - Marco
Are Husbands Necessary? (1942) - Duncan Atterbury
Calling Dr. Gillespie (1942) - Dr. Ward O. Kenwood
The Talk of the Town (1942) - Andrew Holmes
Somewhere I'll Find You (1942) - George L. Stafford
George Washington Slept Here (1942) - Mr. Prescott
Tennessee Johnson (1942) - Senator Jim Waters
Edge of Darkness (1943) - Kaspar Torgerson
Lady of Burlesque (1943) - Inspector Harrigan
Someone to Remember (1943) - Jim Parsons
She's for Me (1943) - Crane
The Song of Bernadette (1943) - Jacomet
Home in Indiana (1944) - Godaw Boole
The National Barn Dance (1944) - Mr. Garvey
Together Again (1944) - Morton Buchanan
Here Come the Co-Eds (1945) - Jonathan Kirkland
A Medal for Benny (1945) - Zach Mibbe
Guest Wife (1945) - Arthur Truesdale Worth
Cinderella Jones (1946) - Minland
The Wife of Monte Cristo (1946) - Danglars
Centennial Summer (1946) - J.P. Snodgrass
Three Wise Fools (1946) - Paul Badger
Sister Kenny (1946) - Michael Kenny
The Beast with Five Fingers (1946) - Raymond Arlington
Duel in the Sun (1946) - Sheriff Hardy
My Favorite Brunette (1947) - Major Simon Montague
Welcome Stranger (1947) - Charles 'C.J.' Chesley
The Romance of Rosy Ridge (1947) - John Dessark
If You Knew Susie (1948) - Mr. Whitley
State of the Union (1948) - Bill Nolard Hardy
A Southern Yankee (1948) - Col. Weatherby
Big Jack (1949) - Mathias Taylor
Never Wave at a WAC (1953) - Sen. Tom Reynolds
Call Me Madam (1953) - Sen. Brockway
The President's Lady (1953) - Capt. Irwin
Half a Hero (1953) - Mr. Bascomb
The Court-Martial of Billy Mitchell (1955) - Sen. Fullerton (final film role)

References

External links

 
 

1887 births
1956 deaths
American male film actors
Male actors from Indiana
People from Wabash, Indiana
Male actors from Worcester, Massachusetts
20th-century American male actors